Sweet Freedom is the sixth studio album by British rock band Uriah Heep, released on 3 September 1973 by Bronze Records in the UK and Warner Bros. Records in the US.

The original vinyl release was a gatefold, reproducing the lyrics within. There was also a central page with a photograph of each band member.

It was the first Uriah Heep album to be released by Warner Bros. in the U.S. Sweet Freedom reached No. 33 in the US Billboard 200 chart. It was certified gold by the RIAA on 5 March 1974.

AllMusic's retrospective review noted that Heep "began to explore new styles to flesh out their combination of prog complexity and heavy metal muscle."

The album was remastered and reissued by Castle Communications in 1996 with two bonus tracks, and again in 2004 in an expanded deluxe edition.

Track listing

Personnel
Uriah Heep
David Byron – vocals
Mick Box – guitars
Ken Hensley – keyboards, guitars, backing vocals
Lee Kerslake – drums, percussion, backing vocals
Gary Thain – bass guitar

Production
Gerry Bron – producer
Peter Gallen – engineer, mixing at Lansdowne Studios, London

Charts

Album

Singles

Certifications

References

External links
 The Official Uriah Heep Discography

1973 albums
Uriah Heep (band) albums
Albums produced by Gerry Bron
Bronze Records albums
Warner Records albums
Chrysalis Records albums